A Man of Gold or A Man and His Wife (French: Un homme en or) is a 1934 French drama film directed by Jean Dréville and starring Harry Baur, Suzy Vernon and Josseline Gaël.

The film's sets were designed by the art director Robert Hubert.

Synopsis
Bored with life with her civil servant husband, his wife leaves him for a fling with another man. However, he subsequently becomes rich.

Cast
 Harry Baur as 	Papon
 Suzy Vernon as Janette
 Guy Derlan as Roland Hardi
 Josseline Gaël as Marcelle
 Pierre Larquey as Moineau 
 Christiane Dor as Berthe
 Robert Clermont as du Pecq
 Jacques Maury as Jacques

References

Bibliography 
 Goble, Alan. The Complete Index to Literary Sources in Film. Walter de Gruyter, 1999.

External links 
 

1934 films
1934 drama films
French drama films
1930s French-language films
Films directed by Jean Dréville
1930s French films